Spenolimycin is a spectinomycin-type antibiotic which has been isolated from the bacterium Streptomyces gilvospiralissp. Spenolimycin has the molecular formula C15H26N2O7.

References

Further reading 

 

Spenolimycin
Antibiotics
Oxygen heterocycles
Secondary amines
Methoxy compounds
Diamines